The 1948 Davis Cup was the 37th edition of the most important tournament between national teams in men's tennis. 25 teams entered the Europe Zone, and four teams entered the America Zone. Pakistan and Turkey made their first appearances in the competition.

Australia defeated Mexico in the America Zone final, and Czechoslovakia defeated Sweden in the Europe Zone final. Australia defeated Czechoslovakia in the Inter-Zonal play-off, but fell to defending champions the United States in the Challenge Round. The championship was played at the West Side Tennis Club in Forest Hills, New York, United States on 4–6 September.

America Zone

Draw

Final
Mexico vs. Australia

Europe Zone

Draw

Final
Czechoslovakia vs. Sweden

Inter-Zonal Final
Australia vs. Czechoslovakia

Challenge Round
United States vs. Australia

References

External links
Davis Cup official website

 
Davis Cups by year
Davis Cup
Davis Cup
Davis Cup
Davis Cup